Pierre Granier-Deferre (27 July 1927 – 16 November 2007) was a French film director and screenwriter  

His 1971 film Le Chat (The Cat) won the Best Actor and Best Actress awards at the 21st Berlin International Film Festival. His 1964 film The Adventures of Salavin won the Silver Shell for Best Actor at the 12th San Sebastian International Film Festival.

Family
Granier-Deferre married Annie Fratellini, who starred in his film La Métamorphose des cloportes. They had one daughter, Valerie.

He had two children with his second wife, Susan Hampshire, an English actress: a son, Christopher, a producer/director, and a daughter, Victoria, who died shortly after birth. Granier-Deferre is also the father of Denys Granier-Deferre, a director/actor, whose mother is Denise Leve.

He is also the father of Célia (an actress) and Marie (a stuntwoman) by Isabel Garcia de Herreros (a film editor).

Filmography
[D] = Director; [W] = Writer
1962: Le Petit garçon de l'ascenseur [D], [W]
1964: The Adventures of Salavin
1965: La Métamorphose des cloportes [D], [W], with Lino Ventura, Charles Aznavour
1965: Paris au mois d'août [D], [W], with Charles Aznavour
1967:  [D], [W]
1970: La Horse [D], [W], with Jean Gabin
1971: Le Chat [D], [W], with Jean Gabin, Simone Signoret
1971: La Veuve Couderc [D], [W], with Simone Signoret, Alain Delon
1973:  [D], [W], with Yves Montand
1973: Le Train [D], [W], with Jean-Louis Trintignant, Romy Schneider
1974: La Race des seigneurs [D], [W], with Alain Delon
1975:  [D], [W], with Lino Ventura, Ingrid Thulin
1975: Adieu poulet [D], with Lino Ventura, Patrick Dewaere
1976: Une femme à sa fenêtre [D], [W], with Romy Schneider
1976: Le Toubib [D], [W], with Alain Delon, Véronique Jannot
1981: Une étrange affaire [D], [W], with Gérard Lanvin, Michel Piccoli
1982: L'Étoile du Nord [D], [W], with Simone Signoret, Philippe Noiret
1983:  [D], [W], with Philippe Noiret, Jean Rochefort, Françoise Fabian
1985: L'Homme aux yeux d'argent [D], [W], with Alain Souchon
1986: Cours privé [D], [W], with Michel Aumont, Élizabeth Bourgine
1987:  [D], [W], with Philippe Noiret
1988: La Couleur du vent [D]
1990: L'Autrichienne [D], with Ute Lemper
1995: Le Petit Garçon [D]
1992: la Voix [D], [W]
1992: Archipel [D], [W]
1995: Maigret et la vente à la bougie (TV) [D], [W], with Bruno Cremer
1996: La Dernière Fête (TV) [D], [W], with Bruno Cremer
1997: Maigret et l'enfant de chœur (TV) [D], [W], with Bruno Cremer
2001: Maigret et la fenêtre ouverte (TV) [D], with Bruno Cremer

References

External links
 
 Obituary

French film directors
1927 births
2007 deaths